Centre-to-centre distance (c.t.c. distance or ctc distance) is a concept for distances, also called on-center spacing (o.c. spacing or oc spacing), heart distance, and pitch.

It is the distance between the centre (the heart) of a column and the centre (the heart) of another column. By expressing a distance in c.t.c., one can measure distances between columns with different diameters without confusion. This concept applies to other architectural features that may have variable diameters/widths and spacings, such as pillars or ceiling beams and baffles.

Architectural terminology
Columns and entablature
Technical drawing